Daybreak Northern Ireland (previously GMTV Northern Ireland) is the regional news strand for Northern Ireland provided for the ITV breakfast station ITV Breakfast.

Unlike the ITV plc-owned  regions, UTV - the ITV contractor for Northern Ireland - did not provide regional news broadcasts during Daybreak (previously GMTV). This was due to a dispute between UTV and GMTV which dates back to 1994 when UTV opted out of the national breakfast contractor in breach of their broadcasting licence to provide live coverage of the breaking news of the Combined Loyalist ceasefire.

GMTV Northern Ireland was rebranded as Daybreak Northern Ireland in September 2010, when GMTV was replaced by new breakfast programme, Daybreak. Regional bulletins aired three times each weekday, and included a look at the days main headlines, a travel news update, and a weather forecast.

Service
In January 1995, GMTV contracted the service out to Reuters, who then provided the GMTV national news service. The service was produced by ITN from March 2000. Macmillan Media, a company founded by former ITN and BBC correspondent Michael Macmillan, won the contract to provide news bulletins in 2005.

Macmillan Media took over from STV as the regional breakfast news provider in the Central Scotland and Northern Scotland regions in 2007.

The Daybreak Northern Ireland service by Macmillan Media ended on Friday 21 December 2012, with UTV resuming production of the breakfast news opt-outs from January 2013 onwards.

The team
Sonia Butterworth (Now with U105)
Richard Cull
Lynda Fulford
Lindsey Armstrong (now freelancing with UTV after working at BBC Northern Ireland)
Vicki Hawthorne (now freelance, appears on Sky News)
Emma Johnston 
Aideen Kennedy (now with UTV)
Barbara McCann (now with BBC Northern Ireland)
Siobhan McGarry
Maura O'Brien
Kirsteen O'Sullivan (Now with TV3)
Charlie Oundo
Paul Reilly (now with UTV)
Nicola Thompson (now with BBC)
Jane Veitch
Patricia Wilkinson (now with BBC Northern Ireland)
Adrian Horsman (now with Christian Aid Ireland)

References

1995 British television series debuts
2000s British television series
2012 British television series endings
ITV regional news shows
Television shows from Northern Ireland
Television news in Northern Ireland